The 2020 Mosconi Cup was a team nine-ball tournament, between teams representing Europe and the United States. It was the 27th edition of the competition and took place between 1–4 December 2020. The event was originally scheduled to be held at the Alexandra Palace in London, however it was moved to the Ricoh Arena in Coventry with the whole event behind closed doors in a Covid-19 secure bubble. The coronavirus pandemic also affected the team selection, with Corey Deuel replacing Justin Bergman for Team USA after Bergman tested positive for Covid-19.
Team USA were defending champions, having won the two previous tournaments. After a close first day, Team Europe were 3-2 ahead but only lost one further match, winning the cup 11-3. Jayson Shaw won the Most Valuable Player award for the first time after winning all his singles and doubles matches.

Teams

Results

Tuesday, 1 December

Wednesday, 2 December

Thursday, 3 December

References

External links
 Official homepage

2020
2020 in cue sports
2020 in English sport
Sports competitions in Coventry
International sports competitions hosted by England
December 2020 sports events in the United Kingdom
2020s in Coventry